The French Lick Open was a golf tournament on the LPGA Tour, played only in 1958. It was played at the French Lick-Sheraton Hotel Country Club in French Lick, Indiana. Louise Suggs won the event.

References

Former LPGA Tour events
Golf in Indiana
1958 establishments in Indiana
1958 disestablishments in Indiana
History of women in Indiana